Caeiro is a Portuguese surname. Notable people with the surname include:

Celeste Caeiro (born 1933), Portuguese pacifist worker
Francisco José Caeiro (1890–1976), Portuguese politician
João Caeiro (died 1548), Portuguese mercenary
José Caeiro (1925–1981), Spanish footballer
Teresa Caeiro (born 1969), Portuguese lawyer and politician
Tiago Caeiro (born 1984), Portuguese footballer

Portuguese-language surnames